The 2009–10 season was Portogruaro's 19th season of football and it is the second season in the Lega Pro 1, Italian third division.

Squad

Francesco Rossi
Christian Altinier
Riccardo Bocalon
Denny Cardin
Carlo Cherubini
Marco Cunico
Vinicio Espinal
Matteo Deinite
Massimo Gotti
Marco Cunico
Fabio Levacovich
Adrian Madaschi
Andrea Maniero
Ettore Marchi
Daniele Mattielig
Stefano Pondaco
Gabriele Puccio
Luca Scapuzzi
Matteo Scozzarella
Angelo Siniscalchi
Gianmario Specchia
Bruno Leonardo Vicente

Competitions

Standings

References

External links

Italian football clubs 2009–10 season
A.S.D. Portogruaro seasons